Lewis Smith Parks (13 April 1902 – 27 April 1982), was triple Navy Cross recipient and decorated submarine commander during World War II who reached the rank of Rear Admiral in the United States Navy.

Lewis Smith Parks was born April 13, 1902 in Bayport, New York to minister John Emory and Minerva Parks (née Smith). He was accepted the United States Naval Academy in 1921. Graduating in 1925, Parks was commissioned as an Ensign in the United States Navy and received orders to the USS Wyoming (BB-32). Parks would later receive instruction for submarines and at the start of World War II was the commander of the USS Pompano (SS-181). For each of his first and second war patrols aboard Pompano he was awarded the Navy Cross. After leaving Pompano, Parks took command of Submarine Attack Group 9, which he commanded from USS Parche (SS-384). For the two war patrols aboard Parch, Parks was awarded his third Navy Cross. During 1943-1945, Parks also commanded Submarine Division 202, for the success of that command he was awarded the Legion of Merit. During the Korean War, Parks commanded the USS Manchester (CL-83). He retired in 1960 and moved to Pompano, Florida, where he died in 1982.

References

1902 births
1982 deaths
United States Navy rear admirals (upper half)
Submarine commanders
United States Naval Academy alumni
Recipients of the Navy Cross (United States)
United States Navy personnel of World War II
20th-century American naval officers